The Iullemmeden Basin (Berber language: Iwellemmedden) is a major sub-Saharan inland basin in West Africa, extending about  north to south and  east to west. It covers western Niger and parts of Algeria, Mali and Nigeria. It is named after the Iullemmeden, a federation of Tuareg people who live in the central region of Niger. Its geographic range is largely coincident with the Azawagh region.

Description 
The area of the Iullemmeden Basin seems to have started to subside in Permo-Triassic times, and to have experienced gradual downwarping during the Late Cretaceous to Paleogene times, while steadily filling with sediment. Two prominent fault trends run NNE-SSW through the center of the basin, while WSW-ENE faults trends are found in the northeast of the basin near the Aïr Mountains.

Stratigraphy 
Potentially valuable minerals include uranium and copper ores and coal and salt deposits. Niger is one of the world's largest producers of uranium.

Formations of the Iullemmeden Basin 

 Gwandu Formation
 Kalambaina Formation
 Wurno Formation
 Taloka Formation
 Dukamaje Formation
 Igdaman Group
 Majias Group
 Farin Doutchi Formation
 In Beceten Formation
 Zoo Baba Formation
 Alanlara Formation
 Tegama Group
 Farak Formation
 Echkar Formation
 Elrhaz Formation
 Tazolé Formation
 Ilrhazer Group
 Tiourarén Formation
 Irhazer Shale
 Téfidet Group	
 Tagrezou Sandstone
 Agadez Group
 Assaouas Formation
 Tchirezrine Formation
 Teloua Formation
 Izégouandane Group
 Moradi Formation
 Tamamait Formation
 Tejia Formation
 Izégouandane Formation

See also 

Chad Basin
Niger Delta Basin
Taoudeni Basin

References

Bibliography

Further reading 
 

Sedimentary basins of Africa
Landforms of Algeria
Landforms of Mali
Landforms of Niger
Landforms of Nigeria
Landforms of Benin
Geology of Algeria
Geology of Mali
Geology of Niger
Geology of Nigeria
Geology of Benin